The light-crowned spinetail (Cranioleuca albiceps) is a species of bird in the family Furnariidae. It is found in Bolivia and eastern Peru, where its natural habitat is subtropical or tropical moist montane forests.

References

light-crowned spinetail
Birds of the Bolivian Andes
light-crowned spinetail
Taxonomy articles created by Polbot